Liverpool High School (LHS) is a comprehensive New York public high school located on Wetzel Road in Liverpool, northwest of the city of Syracuse in the Liverpool Central School District, serving ninth to twelfth grade students. It is the only high school within the district, and is the successor to Liverpool Middle School, Soule Road Middle School, Chestnut Hill Middle School, and Morgan Road Middle School. The school is governed under the authority of the New York State Education Department, whose standardized examinations are designed and administered by the Board of Regents of the University of the State of New York.

Liverpool High School Annex
The Annex was one half of Morgan Road School, which housed grade nine; the other half hosts the Morgan Road Elementary School. A faculty-led initiative in 2007 led to the re-branding of the school as "LHX" - an acronym of Liverpool High School Annex.  This was done to highlight the fact that the Annex was part of Liverpool High School, yet also a distinct educational environment. The Annex closed in 2021 to become Morgan Road Middle School, and moved the freshmen to the main building.

Renovation
Liverpool High School is a part of the Liverpool Central School District capital project to renovate and improve buildings in the district. The project was approved by voters on March 10, 2016, and allocates $39,481,107 to district-wide improvements. Modifications to the LHS main building will include relocation of the main entrance, expansions to the auditorium, offices, gymnasium, various art rooms, and the band, orchestra and choral rooms, as well as replacement and upgrades to the building utilities.  While renovations are underway, classes that are usually held in the areas under construction are being held at Wetzel Road Elementary School, a past elementary school within a short walking distance of LHS that was closed down after the 2009-2010 school year.

Academics

Curriculum
Liverpool High School offers more than 150 different courses in English, Social Studies, Mathematics, Science, Languages Other Than English, Art, Music, Family & Consumer Science, Health, Business, Technology, and Physical Education. Workforce Preparation Programs are available through Onondaga-Cortland-Madison Board of Cooperative Education (BOCES). The school focuses on graduating all students with the minimum of a Regents Diploma, but some may also graduate with a less advanced local diploma. The Regents Diploma with Advanced Designation may be achieved with extended studies in a foreign language.

Though the curriculum is developed and sanctioned by the New York State Department of Education, and classes are developed to prepare students to achieve success on the required Regents Examinations, most core courses offer one or two components that explore more advanced topics. The school not only offers standard level Regents courses (Academic level), but also offers more advanced Advanced Placement (AP), College-credit (College), and Honors (H) courses. The criteria used in placing students in the instructional levels are classroom performance, teacher and counselor recommendations, standardized test scores, and individual student preferences. Advanced students may begin earning high school credits in middle school through an accelerated program in mathematics and/ or foreign language.

The school uses a 100 grade point scale, as opposed to the much more common 4.0 scale. The rank in class is established by placing students in descending order from highest to lowest according to their weighted grade point average. The weighted grade point average is calculated with Advanced Placement (AP) courses and College Level courses weighted at 1.1 and Honors Level courses weighted at 1.05.

Course offerings
Mathematics: Integrated Algebra, Geometry, Trigonometry, Calculus AB, Precalculus, Computer Science
Science: Biology, Chemistry, Physics, Earth Science
History: Global History, United States History, United States Government & Politics, Economics, Psychology, Sociology, Civil & Criminal Law
Foreign Language: Spanish, French, Latin
Humanities: Writing, Journalism, Public Speaking
Physical Education, and Health: Fitness, Weightlifting, Health, Personal Safety
Arts: Studio Art, Choir, Band, Orchestra, Music Theory
Technology: Project Lead The Way, DECA, Computer Aided Design, Graphic Design, Broadcasting Technology

Advanced Placement
Mathematics: Calculus AB, Calculus BC, Statistics, Computer Science
Science: Biology, Chemistry, Physics B
Humanities: Language and Composition, Literature and Composition
Social Studies: World History, United States History, Government & Politics: US, European History, Economics: Macro
Foreign Language: Spanish, French
Arts: Studio Art, Music Theory

Syracuse University Project Advance (SUPA)
Humanities: English Literature, English Composition, Psychology, Web Design

Athletics and extracurriculars

Athletics
Liverpool High School's 32 varsity athletic teams the American Division of the OHL, Section III of the New York State Public High School Athletic Association (NYSPHSAA) New York State Public High School Athletic Association, and Section III of the New York State Scholastic Rowing Association NYSRowing.com - Welcome. Liverpool has over 30 varsity teams and over 45 other teams that provide a range of team and individual sports. A wide variety of teams CNYCL and Section III championships every year, and the vast majority of athletes are honored with NYS Scholar Athlete Awards. The school has won state titles in multiple individual and team sports including boys and girls cross country, tennis, soccer, swimming, track, wrestling, lacrosse, football and cheerleading . Many teams also have modified, freshman and junior varsity components. To be eligible for any athletic activity or extracurricular activity, students must maintain a 70 overall average. In addition students are required to pass at least four subjects. The varsity teams include:

All varsity teams practice and compete on the high school campus, with a few exceptions. The hockey team practices and competes at the Greater Baldwinsville Ice Arena in Baldwinsville, New York and crew teams practice on Onondaga Lake and compete at various venues. Also, the indoor track teams compete at various colleges and venues.

Stadium
Liverpool High School shut down their stadium in 2007 after it was deemed unsafe to play because of the uneven turf. While it was shut down, home football games were played in the Syracuse University Carrier Dome. In 2010, after much debate with taxpayers, the 6.8 million dollar stadium was completed with state and district funds. The new stadium complex is very similar to the old complex however there are several improvements. Namely, the new stadium includes new bleachers on both sides of the field, a new running track and drainage system, an upgraded press box, visitor stands opposite the main stands, upgraded concession stand, and an enclosed box used for district officials and other notable guests.

Clubs and organizations
Art Club
Becca's Closet
Bass Club
Casting Hall
Christian Students of Liverpool
Concert Choir
Concert Orchestra
eSports Club
FAME
FIRST Robotics Club
French Club
Freshman Class
GSA (Gay-Straight Alliance)
Girls Only Choir
Global Exchange Club
Jazz Ensemble
Junior Class
Kaleidescope Literary Magazine
Marching Band
Math League
Model United Nations (Model UN)
Musical
Pit Orchestra
School-wide Student Council
Science Olympiad
Senior Class
Sky/Snowboard Club
Sofia the First Roleplay Club
Spanish Club
Stage Band
Step Club
String Ensemble
Symphonic Orchestra
TSA (Technology Student Association)/VEX Robotics Club
Theatre Arts Club
UMOJA
Varsity Club
Winter Color Guard
Winter Drumline
YEA
Yearbook Club (The Hiawathan)

National memberships
LHS has several local chapters of nationwide organizations.
Academic Decathlon
DECA
Key Club
National Art Honor Society
National Honor Society
National Junior Honor Society
SADD (Students Against Destructive Decisions)

Demographics
As of the 2019-2020 school year, there were 2,147 students enrolled at Liverpool High School: 572 in grade nine, 502 in grade ten, 559 in grade eleven, and 514 in grade twelve. The racial/ethnic makeup of the student population was: 74% White, 11% Black or African American, 5% Asian or Pacific Islander, 5% Hispanic.

There were 151 teachers employed at the school, making the student to teacher ratio approximately 15:1.

Notable alumni
Dave Tretowicz - retired NHL/USA Olympic Ice Hockey Player
Scott Cassidy - retired MLB pitcher
Josh Ford - goalkeeper for Seattle Sounders FC of MLS
Chris Gedney - former NFL tight end
Gene Grabosky - former NFL defensive tackle
Tim Green - retired NFL linebacker/defensive end, author
Pete Holohan - retired NFL tight end
Chris Jones - retired MLB outfielder
Marc Mero - retired amateur boxer and professional wrestler.
Mike Rawlings - mayor of Dallas, TX
Jen Rhines - Olympic long-distance runner
Jack Smith, US special prosecutor 
Paul Tripoli - retired NFL defensive back

External links
Liverpool High School homepage
Liverpool Central School District homepage

References

Public high schools in New York (state)
Schools in Onondaga County, New York